Neocollyris tenuis is a species of ground beetle in the family Carabidae. It is found in Indonesia.

References

Tenuis, Neocollyris
Beetles described in 1994